Iota Apodis (ι Aps, ι Apodis) is the Bayer designation for a binary star system in the southern circumpolar constellation of Apus. It is a faint target at an apparent visual magnitude of 5.41, but still visible to the naked eye from suitably dark skies.

Both stars are B-type main sequence stars, which indicates they shine with a blue-white hue. The brighter component has a stellar classification of B9 V and an apparent magnitude 5.90, while the second member is a B9.5 V star with a magnitude of 6.46. The pair have an angular separation of 0.091 arcseconds with an estimated orbital period of 59.32 years. They are about 3.89 and 3.45 times as massive as the Sun.

Naming

References

External links
 Image Iota Apodis

Binary stars
Apodis, Iota
Apus (constellation)
B-type main-sequence stars
Durchmusterung objects
156190
084979
6411